Man vs Fly is an entertainment game show. Premiered on 13 March 2016 on Che channel. It is hosted by Dmitry Guberniyev and Roman Vagin. It's the Russian version of British show Man vs Fly.

Rules 
Eight battles are in one episode (each battle is one episode running 3 minutes 30 seconds). Celebrities and usual contestants are competing in a hilarious battle against the ordinary fly in small white room. The ‘chocolate’ girl and ordinary persons are among them. The configured fighters is given one minute to beat an annoying fly. For struggle against the fly contestants face in different sorts and with various items, such as the ventilator, the slippery Northern pike, PP Duster, a spell book, a guitar, a towel, blender, a racquet and even a ping-pong ball. It's strictly prohibited to use hands. If the insect was successful beaten, then the contestant earns 1 000 rubles.

Facts 
 As of March 10, 2016 was filmed 64 episodes.

References

External links 
 Official website 
 Шоу: Человек против мухи — Вокруг ТВ 
 «Человек против мухи»: новое развлекательное шоу на «Че» 
 На «Че» стартует шоу «Человек против мухи» 
 Популярный комментатор станет голосом шоу «Человек против мухи» 
 Описание шоу, отзывы и рецензии 

2016 Russian television series debuts
Russian game shows
2010s Russian television series